Zelandotipula is a genus of true crane fly.

Species

Z. acutistyla (Alexander, 1946)
Z. associans (Walker, 1861)
Z. austrofurcifera Alexander, 1969
Z. azuayensis Alexander, 1980
Z. bisatra (Alexander, 1962)
Z. calvicornis (Edwards, 1920)
Z. calypso (Alexander, 1946)
Z. catamarcensis (Alexander, 1920)
Z. celestissima (Alexander, 1954)
Z. chimborazo (Alexander, 1946)
Z. corynostyla Alexander, 1969
Z. cristalta (Alexander, 1946)
Z. cristifera (Alexander, 1946)
Z. cristobtusa (Alexander, 1946)
Z. daedalus Alexander, 1976
Z. diducta Alexander, 1969
Z. exserrata Alexander, 1981
Z. fassliana (Alexander, 1962)
Z. flavicornis (Alexander, 1914)
Z. flavogenualis (Alexander, 1946)
Z. forsteriana (Alexander, 1962)
Z. fulva (Hutton, 1900)
Z. furcifera (Alexander, 1944)
Z. gracilipes (Walker, 1837)
Z. hirtistylata Alexander, 1976
Z. horni (Alexander, 1926)
Z. infernalis (Alexander, 1947)
Z. juturna (Alexander, 1946)
Z. laevis (Alexander, 1914)
Z. lassula (Alexander, 1940)
Z. longitarsis (Macquart, 1846)
Z. luteivena (Alexander, 1946)
Z. melanopodia Alexander, 1980
Z. monostictula (Alexander, 1946)
Z. nebulipennata Alexander, 1980
Z. neurotrichia (Alexander, 1962)
Z. nigrosetosa (Alexander, 1946)
Z. novarae (Schiner, 1868)
Z. orophila (Alexander, 1914)
Z. otagana (Alexander, 1922)
Z. parviceps (Speiser, 1909)
Z. parvimacula (Alexander, 1945)
Z. perlongistyla Alexander, 1980
Z. perobtusa Alexander, 1969
Z. perstrangalia (Alexander, 1962)
Z. peruviana (Alexander, 1914)
Z. plagifera (Alexander, 1943)
Z. retrorsa Alexander, 1969
Z. ringens (Alexander, 1935)
Z. schineri (Alexander, 1934)
Z. septemlineata Alexander, 1980
Z. serratimargo Alexander, 1970
Z. sinuosa (Alexander, 1927)
Z. songoensis (Alexander, 1962)
Z. strangalia (Alexander, 1927)
Z. subcalypso Alexander, 1980
Z. subfurcifer (Alexander, 1945)
Z. sublaevis (Alexander, 1938)
Z. subtarda (Alexander, 1935)
Z. tarda (Alexander, 1935)
Z. triatra (Alexander, 1962)
Z. trichoneura (Alexander, 1962)
Z. tuberculifera (Alexander, 1954)
Z. uniatra (Alexander, 1946)
Z. vivida (Alexander, 1941)
Z. vulpes (Alexander, 1945)
Z. wardiana Alexander, 1981
Z. yungasicola (Alexander, 1962)
Z. zamorae (Alexander, 1946)

References

Catalogue of the Craneflies of the World

Tipulidae